Bidhan may refer to 

Given name
Bidhan Chandra Roy (1882–1962), Chief Minister of West Bengal, India
Bidhan Lama, Olympic taekwondo practitioner from Nepal

Middle name
Kalyan Bidhan Sinha (born 1944), Indian mathematician

Places
Bidhan Sarani, street in Kolkata, India

Others
Bidhan Chandra Krishi Viswavidyalaya, university in West Bengal, India
Bidhan Chandra College, Asansol, West Bengal, India
Bidhan Chandra College, Rishra, West Bengal, India